The Crime of Bordadores Street (Spanish: El crimen de la calle Bordadores) is a 1946 Spanish crime film written and  directed by Edgar Neville.

Cast
Manuel Luna as Miguel Campos
Mary Delgado as Lola, "la billetera"
Antonia Plana as Petra
Julia Lajos as doña Mariana
Rafael Calvo
José Prada as abogado
José Franco

References

Bibliography
 Mira, Alberto. The A to Z of Spanish Cinema. Rowman & Littlefield, 2010.

External links
 

1946 films
1940s Spanish-language films
Spanish black-and-white films
Spain in fiction
Madrid in fiction
Films directed by Edgar Neville
1946 crime films
Spanish crime films
1940s Spanish films